The 2016 Newfoundland and Labrador budget protests were a series of protests in the Canadian province of Newfoundland and Labrador. The protests were in opposition to the provincial budget proposed by Finance Minister Cathy Bennett which will implement tax-hikes and cuts to many public service jobs. The protests were a major part of the financial crisis in Newfoundland and Labrador.

Context

Newfoundland and Labrador is one of Canada's oil-producing provinces and oil revenues account for a significant amount of the province's GDP. During the premiership of Danny Williams, oil prices were high and government spending increased. The province's public sector doubled in size while provincial government spending was 20–36% higher than most other provinces.

The recent drop in the price of oil caused a deficit for the province and the government did not expect to see another surplus until 2022. The provincial budget was unveiled by Finance Minister Cathy Bennett on April 14, 2016. In the budget, plans for more than 400 public-sector job cuts were announced, taxes on gasoline were doubled, the sales tax was increased and a "deficit-reduction levy" was to be introduced. This levy is an additional tax that will be imposed on residents with an annual income between $49,500 and $72,000.

Lower Churchill Project

One of the most notable mega-projects by the province under Williams was the Lower Churchill Project, a hydroelectric project in central Labrador on the Churchill River. During Williams's premiership the project received lots of support from Newfoundlanders however it was much more controversial among Labradorians. The position on the project taken by the Nunatsiavut government was even supported by Amnesty International. The project is being developed by Nalcor Energy and Emera. Nalcor is a provincial crown corporation based in St. John's.

The project is behind schedule and despite the province's financial situation and the high costs of the project, it is expected to continue development.

Reaction to the budget
The budget has been very controversial since its unveiling.

Many notable people from the province have spoken out against the budget. Former Liberal Premier Roger Grimes criticized the introduction of the levy.

Several public and independent groups have formed in the province. These groups are motivated by the cyclical abuse, lack of democracy and mismanagement of the province ever since it joined the Confederation.

The groups or entities included;
-Coordinated Approach
-Mutual Aid
-Free NL
-Golden Arrow Community
-Peoples Union 
-Peoples Assembly
-Newfrownland.ca

Protests
Many protests by various organizations took place after April 2016. Former cabinet ministers under the Progressive Conservative government from 2003–2015 appeared at some protests (including former Premier Paul Davis) where they were often not well received.

Notable protest locations
Bell Island
Bonavista
Burin
Clarenville
Corner Brook
Gambo
Grand Falls-Windsor
Happy Valley-Goose Bay
Harbour Grace
King's Cove
Portugal Cove-St. Philip's
Ramea
St. John's
Swift Current
Wabush
Woody Point

References

2016 in Newfoundland and Labrador
2016 in Canadian politics
Protests in Canada
2016 protests
Liberal Party of Newfoundland and Labrador